Marcela Kubričanová is a former Czechoslovak slalom canoeist who competed in the 1980s. She won a bronze medal in the K-1 team event at the 1983 ICF Canoe Slalom World Championships in Meran.

References

External links 
 Marcela KUBRICANOVA at CanoeSlalom.net

Czechoslovak female canoeists
Living people
Year of birth missing (living people)
Medalists at the ICF Canoe Slalom World Championships